Richard Krajicek defeated Sébastien Grosjean in the final, 4–6, 6–1, 6–2, 7–5 to win the men's singles tennis title at the 1999 Miami Open.

Marcelo Ríos was the defending champion, but lost in the fourth round to Dominik Hrbatý.

Seeds 
All thirty-two seeds received a bye to the second round.

Draw

Finals

Top half

Section 1

Section 2

Section 3

Section 4

Bottom half

Section 5

Section 6

Section 7

Section 8

External links 
 Main draw

Men's Singles
1999 ATP Tour